The men's pole vault at the 2021 World Athletics U20 Championships was held at the Kasarani Stadium on 20 August.

Records

Results

Final
The final was held on 20 August at 10:05.

References

pole vault
Pole vault at the World Athletics U20 Championships